António Galvão, Antonio Galvao, etc. (Portuguese for "Anthony Galvan") may refer to:

 António Galvão (c. 1490–1557), Portuguese soldier, administrator, historican, &c.
 Frei Galvão (1739–1822), Brazilian friar
 Dino (1901–1993), Brazilian soccer player

See also
 Anthony (given name)
 Galvao (surname)